The Open International de Squash de Nantes is an annual international squash tournament for professional players, held in Nantes in France in September. It is part of the PSA World Tour. The event was first held in 2015 in Le Lieu Unique.

History

Competition 
The very first edition of the « Open International de squash de Nantes » was held at Le Lieu Unique in 2015. This edition was also held in the Badmin'Squash club in Rezé during the qualification phase. Since 2016, the qualification phase and 1st rounds have been held in La Maison du Squash club in Sautron.

The competition has evolved since its beginning. It only hosted a men's competition in the first edition. From 2016, the « Open International de squash de Nantes » included for the first time a female competition.

In 2019, the name of the competition grows « Open de France » to include the most important tournaments of the PSA World Tour.

Identity project 
This event links culture and sport by staging squash through a glass court located in an emblematic place of Nantes and by invited artists around Nantes' culture. The competition poster, the teaser, the matches' introduction, the disk jockeys, musicians, dancers, the competition trophy, all these elements are included to give a unique aspect to the competition.

Venues
The competition stands out in particular by the choice of unusual places hosting its events.

Season 1

Past Results

Men's

Women's

See also
PSA World Tour
French Squash Federation

References

External links
 - Official website
 - Open International de Nantes 2015 PSA page

Open international de squash de Nantes